Sumner Lake State Park is a state park of New Mexico, United States, located on the eastern plains about  northwest of Fort Sumner.

The park features a large  reservoir on the Pecos River, created in 1939 by the Sumner Dam of the United States Bureau of Reclamation. The reservoir is home to various fish species including largemouth bass, catfish, crappie and walleye. With its campground, expansive views of the sky, and its distance from other cities, Sumner Lake State Park has a low level of light pollution, which makes the state park a great potential place for amateur astronomy.

Animals
The park is home to the Sandia hairstreak (Callophrys mcfarlandi), New Mexico's state butterfly. About 50 other species of butterflies have been identified in the park.

Flora
One-seed juniper, honey mesquite, and spiny cholla dominate the landscape of the park.

References

External links

 Sumner Lake State Park

State parks of New Mexico
Parks in De Baca County, New Mexico
Protected areas established in 1966